Faisal Darwish; born 3 July 1991) is a Saudi Arabian footballer who plays as a right-sided midfielder or wing-back for Al-Taawoun.

Club career
On 27 May 2018, Darwish left Al-Hilal after 4 years and signed with newly promoted side Al-Wehda.

On 10 January 2020, Darwish joined Al-Taawoun.

Honours
Al Hilal:
 Saudi Professional League (2): 2016–17, 2017–18
 King Cup (2): 2015,2017
 Crown Prince Cup (1): 2015–16
 Saudi Super Cup (1): 2015

References

External links
Saudi League Profile

Saudi Arabian footballers
Association football defenders
Association football midfielders
Saudi Professional League players
Al-Ahli Saudi FC players
Al-Raed FC players
Al Hilal SFC players
Al-Wehda Club (Mecca) players
Al-Taawoun FC players
1991 births
Living people